Brian Norman Halfpenny, CB, QHC, FRSA (born 7 June 1936) is a British Anglican priest and retired military chaplain. From 1988 to 1991, he served as Chaplain-in-Chief, and thereby head of the Royal Air Force Chaplains Branch, and Archdeacon for the Royal Air Force.

Halfpenny was educated at George Dixon Grammar School, Birmingham; St John's College, Oxford; and Wells Theological College. After a curacy in Melksham he served the RAF from 1965 to 1991. He was Team Rector of Redditch from  1991 to 2001.

References

Church of England priests
20th-century English Anglican priests
21st-century English Anglican priests
Royal Air Force Chaplains-in-Chief
People educated at George Dixon Academy
Alumni of St John's College, Oxford
Companions of the Order of the Bath
Alumni of Wells Theological College
1936 births
Living people